The Photo-Drama of Creation, or Creation-Drama, is a four-part audiovisual presentation (eight hours in total) produced by the Watch Tower Bible and Tract Society of Pennsylvania under the direction of Charles Taze Russell, the founder of the Bible Student movement. The presentation presents their beliefs about God's plan from the creation of the earth through to the end of the 1,000 year reign of Christ.

History

Production began in 1912, and the presentation was introduced to audiences in 1914. It was the first major screenplay to incorporate synchronized sound, moving film, and color slides. Russell published an accompanying book, Scenario of the Photo-Drama of Creation, in various languages.

It is about 8 hours in length and was presented in four parts. This presentation took the audience from the time of creation to the end of the Millennium.   The presentation premiered in January 1914 in New York, and in the summer of 1914 in Germany. Over 9,000,000 people in North America, Europe, New Zealand and Australia saw either the full Photo-Drama or an abbreviated version called the Eureka-Drama.

Shows that combined magic lantern slides and films were common at the time, but the addition of recorded speech was unusual, and the magnitude of its distribution for a single religious production was particularly notable. At the time, the project's full cost was estimated at about $300,000 (current value  $).

Content

The Photo-Drama purported that the seven creative "days" in the Book of Genesis equal 49,000 years, based on Russell's belief that each creative day lasts 7,000 years. It claimed that 48,000 years have already passed, such that the final thousand years are "near at hand".

See also 
 List of longest films by running time

Further reading
 Richard Alan Nelson, “Propaganda for God: Pastor Charles Taze Russell and the Multi-Media Photo-Drama of Creation (1914),” in Roland Cosandey, André Gaudreault, and Tom Gunning, editors, Une Invention du diable? Cinéma des premiers temps et religion - An Invention of the Devil? Religion and Early Cinema, Sainte-Foy, Québec, Canada: Les Presses de l’Université Laval & Lausanne, Suisse: Éditions Payot Lausanne, 1992, 230-255; .

References

External links
 
 Photo-Drama: A 100-Year-Old Epic of Faith (Watch Tower Society)

1914 films
Films about evangelicalism
Bible Student movement
Cultural depictions of Adam and Eve
Portrayals of Jesus in film
Cultural depictions of John the Baptist